Hovala is a genus of skipper butterflies in the family Hesperiidae.

Species
Hovala amena (Grose-Smith, 1891)
Hovala arota Evans, 1937
Hovala dispar (Mabille, 1877)
Hovala pardalina (Butler, 1879)
Hovala saclavus (Mabille, 1891)

References

External links

Natural History Museum Lepidoptera genus database

Heteropterinae
Hesperiidae genera